Morses Line is an unincorporated community (village) in Franklin County, Vermont, United States. It is the site of the Morses Line Border Crossing connecting the towns of Franklin and Saint-Armand, Quebec.

The second J. Morse line store was opened at this location in 1871, under the proprietorship of J.M. Hill, Jr.  The hamlet is named after the store around which it grew.

References

Unincorporated communities in Vermont
Unincorporated communities in Franklin County, Vermont